Ryan Companies US, Inc. (or Ryan or Ryan Companies) is a national builder, developer, designer, and real estate manager based in Minneapolis.

Employing over 1500 workers, Ryan specializes in integrated project delivery, building information modeling (BIM), Lean construction practices and sustainable design for office, retail, industrial, public sector, alternative energy (biomass & gasification, wind, solar), healthcare, higher education, hospitality, mission critical, multi-family and senior housing and mixed-use projects.

With in-house construction, design, development, capital markets and real estate management, Ryan uses integrated project delivery (IPD) as a preferred method for and delivering design and construction projects and organizing project teams.

Ryan Companies is currently led by Brian Murray (CEO).  Murray took over for Patrick G. Ryan (Pat) in 2018, and Pat moved to chairman of the board, additionally, Timothy Gray (Tim), moved to chairman emeritus. Ryan has 17 offices in Minneapolis, MN; Rochester, MN; Des Moines, IA; Cedar Rapids, IA; Kansas City, MO; Phoenix, AZ; Tucson, AZ; Chicago, IL; Westmont, IL; Milwaukee, WI; Tampa, FL; Atlanta, GA; San Diego, CA; Austin, TX; Dallas/Fort Worth, TX; Seattle, WA; Denver, CO.

History
Ryan Companies was founded in Hibbing, Minnesota, by James Henry Ryan. Forming a partnership with his sons Francis and Russell, James bought the Frederick Lumber Company and renamed it Ryan Lumber and Coal in 1938. In 1949, Russell and Francis formed Ryan Realty Company to own, finance, and manage the real estate Ryan Lumber and Coal built. In 1989, construction, development, capital markets, and real estate management were joined under Ryan Companies.

In 1946, Ryan built their first National Tea Company store, the company's first design-build/development project. Ryan built 60 National stores over its 30-year relationship with the company.  The company built its first Target store in Bloomington, Minnesota in 1965, and today, builds stores, distribution centers, data centers, and office buildings for the retailer.

Leadership
James Henry Ryan died in 1949. Francis and Russell continued leading the company until 1989 when Russell's son, Jim, became CEO, Pat Ryan became president, and Tim Gray, long-time family friend and company controller, became CFO. Before his death in 2009, Jim Ryan was awarded the Best in Real Estate Lifetime Achievement Award for his contribution to the community, the real estate industry, and his company. Pat Ryan, chairman of the board and former president and CEO, was named in Twin City Business "100 Leaders To Know"  in November, 2014. Brian Murray took over as Ryan Companies CEO in 2018, and is Ryan's first non-family member to lead the company.

Today

Ryan is managing construction for public sector projects including the renovation of the Warren E. Burger Federal Building and US Courthouse in St. Paul, Minnesota, and the construction of the new US Courthouse in Des Moines, Iowa. Ryan will provide preconstruction services for the renovation of the Bishop Henry Whipple Federal Building at Fort Snelling, Minnesota, and will manage a 20-year build-to-suit lease for a GSA Professional Office Building in Phoenix, Arizona. Ryan is also constructing, in association with Gilbane, Inc., the Maricopa County Courthouse Tower in downtown Phoenix, Arizona.

Following the Iowa flood of 2008 Ryan's Cedar Rapids office partnered with Mercy Medical Center, one of two Cedar Rapids hospitals, to recover and restore services within a month. Revitalization of the flooded downtown continues as Ryan manages several construction and repair projects funded by the Federal Emergency Management Agency for the City of Cedar Rapids including the restoration of the Iowa Theater building and the Paramount Theatre as well as the construction of a new public library, fire station and animal-control facility.

Ryan will provide real estate management assignment for Capella Tower, also known as 225 South Sixth Street, located in downtown Minneapolis. This assignment broadens the existing local relationship that ASB Capital Management has with the team of Ryan and CB Richard Ellis (leasing agent) at the AT&T Tower in Minneapolis.

In 2007, Ryan was named the National Association of Industrial and Office Properties’ (NAIOP) Developer of the Year.

Other major projects and properties 2005-2019
Major projects:
 Downtown East, Minneapolis, MN
 Marina Heights, Tempe, AZ
 Kirkland Urban, Kirkland, WA
 Two MarketPointe
 W Minneapolis – The Foshay(Foshay Tower)
 Grain Belt Brewhouse
 The Mosaic Company’s Florida Office Building
 Rosemont Corporate Center — home to Cisco Systems and Delta Dental of Illinois’ corporate headquarters.
 Midtown Exchange (former Lake Street Sears) which included public-private partnership with community groups and the City of Minneapolis.

Projects in construction:

 Twin Cities Assembly Plant redevelopment as Highland Bridge in Saint Paul, Minnesota
 UniSource Energy Corporation's corporate headquarters
 W.L. Gore and Associates Biomedical Manufacturing Campus.

Real estate management:
 Portfolio for Sumitomo Corporation of America, which includes Miami Center, 123 Mission Street, 1750 K Street and Hayden Ferry Lakeside.

Community support
In addition to working with communities on construction and development projects, the company contributes to communities through the Ryan Foundation. In addition to funding projects Ryan owners want to support, such as the Cristo Rey Jesuit High School Twin Cities/Colin Powell Youth Leadership Center and the YMCA at Kelly Hall, the Foundation provides support dollar-for-dollar for employees’ community support activities. Overall, the company contributes 10% of Ryan's profits to community projects nationwide. Employees are also encouraged to donate 5% of their work-time to volunteer efforts. In 2019 over 385 charitable organizations benefit from Ryan and its employees.  During the fall annual giving campaign, Ryan and its employees donated $489,433 with an overall 2019 contribution of $858,130 from employees and Ryan matching funds.

Safety
More than 5,100,000 labor-hours were worked on Ryan jobsites in 2009. According to the US Bureau of Labor Statistics, Ryan's lost-time injury rate is 1/10 of the industry average. Ryan works with the Occupational Safety and Health Administration and recently entered into a safety partnership with OSHA, Wisconsin. Ryan's current workers’ compensation moderation rate is .75.

Super Bowl’s Minneapolis Stadium Brings a Surge in Development

References

External links
 
 Corval Ryan
 NAIOP

Construction and civil engineering companies of the United States
Architecture firms based in Minnesota
Real estate companies of the United States